The following is a list of 2023 box office number-one films in France.

Highest-grossing films of 2023

References

External links

2023
France
2023 in French cinema